Ma jeunesse fout le camp... is the seventh studio album by French singer-songwriter Françoise Hardy, released in November 1967 on Disques Vogue. The title is very idiomatic, but it in English its general meaning is 'My youth is slipping away'.

The album was released halfway between her initial years in the yé-yé phenomenon and her more singer-songwriter albums like La question, and has been described as "her farewell to the yéyé years."

Track list 
Except as noted, words and music were written by Françoise Hardy, and she is accompanied by the Charles Blackwell orchestra.

 "Ma jeunesse fout le camp" – 3:05Lyrics and music written by: Guy BontempelliFirst performed by: Michèle Arnaud, 1962
 "Viens là" – 2:25
 "Mon amour adieu" – 2:20Music written by: Hasell
 "La Fin de l’été" – 2:35Original title: "À la fin de l’été… (Tu sais)"Lyrics by: Jean-Max RivièreMusic written by: Gérard BourgeoisFirst performed by: Brigitte Bardot, 1964
 "En vous aimant bien" – 2:15Accompanied by: John Paul Jones
 "Qui peut dire?" – 2:05Accompanied by: Jacques Dutronc
 "Des ronds dans l'eau" – 2:25Lyrics by: Pierre BarouhMusic written by: Raymond Le SénéchalFirst performed by: Nicole Croisille and Annie Girardot, 1967
 "Il n’y a pas d’amour heureux" – 2:20Lyrics: poem by Louis AragonMusic written by: Georges Brassens First performed by: Georges Brassens, 1953
 "Il est trop loin" – 3:40Original title: "Sorrow"Lyrics and music written by: Peter Yarrow and Noel "Paul" StookeyFirst performed by: Peter, Paul and Mary, 1962French adaptation by: Daniel Hortis and Danyel Gérard
 "Mais il y a des soirs" – 2:10Accompanied by: John Paul Jones
 "Voilà" – 3:20Accompanied by: Jacques Denjean
 "C’était charmant" – 1:55

Editions

LP records: first editions in the English-speaking world 
 , 1968: Ma jeunesse fout le camp..., World Record Club (ORL 6016).
 , 1968: Ma jeunesse fout le camp..., Phono Vox (LPV 005).
 , 1968: Ma jeunesse fout le camp…, Disques Vogue/Vogue international industries (VC 6020).
 , 1968: Il n’y a pas d’amour heureux, United Artists Records (ULP 1191).
 , 1968: Ma jeunesse fout le camp…, Phono Vox (LPV 005).
 , 1969: Mon Amour Adieu, Reprise Records (RS 6345).

Reissue on CD 
 , 1995: Ma jeunesse fout le camp..., Kundalini/Vogue/Virgin Records (7243 8 40501 2 2).

Notes and references 

Françoise Hardy albums
1967 albums
French-language albums
Disques Vogue albums